Henry Borden,  (25 September 1901 – 5 May 1989) was a Canadian lawyer, businessman, and public servant. He was the nephew of prime minister Sir Robert Borden.

At the outbreak of the Second World War, he was appointed to the War Supply Board. In 1942, he was appointed chairman of the War Time Industries Control Board. He was appointed a CMG for his wartime service.

References 

Alumni of Exeter College, Oxford
1901 births
1989 deaths
20th-century Canadian lawyers
Canadian Companions of the Order of St Michael and St George
Canadian businesspeople
McGill University alumni
Dalhousie University alumni
Officers of the Order of Canada
Canadian King's Counsel